Amzi Davis Harmon (April 18, 1845 – October 9, 1927) was an American soldier who fought in the American Civil War. Harmon received his country's highest award for bravery during combat, the Medal of Honor. Harmon's medal was won for his capturing of a Confederate States Army flag during the Third Battle of Petersburg, in Virginia on April 2, 1865. He was honored with the award on May 20, 1865.

Harmon was born in Wilkinsburg, Pennsylvania, and entered service in Greensburg, Pennsylvania. He was buried in St. Cloud, Florida.

Medal of Honor citation

See also

List of American Civil War Medal of Honor recipients: G–L
Third Battle of Petersburg
211th Pennsylvania Infantry

Notes

References

External links

1845 births
1927 deaths
American Civil War recipients of the Medal of Honor
People from Wilkinsburg, Pennsylvania
People of Pennsylvania in the American Civil War
Union Army officers
United States Army Medal of Honor recipients